Rutger Beke (pronounced "bay-kuh") (Halle, 8 August 1977) is a retired Belgian triathlete living in Leuven. Beke competed for the Uplace Pro Triathlon Team until he announced his retirement from professional triathlon on 31 May 2011.

Rutger Beke started competing in the sport of triathlon when he was 17. He performed well in several Ironman races, including five top five placings in the Ironman Hawaii.

Beke became well-known because of his alleged EPO use. In 2004, he was tested positive in both his A- and B-sample for EPO. He was suspended from competition for 18 months. In August 2005, the Commission reversed its decision and exonerated him based on scientific and medical information presented by Beke. He asserted that his sample had become degraded as a result of bacterial contamination and that the substance identified by the laboratory as pharmaceutical EPO was, in fact, an unrelated protein indistinguishable from pharmaceutical EPO in the test method. He claimed, therefore, that the test had produced a false positive result in his case.

In 2007, he was the 5th Belgian who won an Ironman, together with Luc Van Lierde, Dirk van Gossum, Marino Vanhoenacker and Gerrit Schellens.

Results
 2000: 1st in Belgian Olympic distance triathlon
 2001: 1st in Belgian Olympic distance triathlon
 2002: 1st in Belgian long distance triathlon
 2002: 3rd in ITU World Championships - Nice
 2003: 1st in Belgian Olympic distance triathlon
 2003: 1st in Belgian long distance triathlon
 2003: 3rd in Ironman Florida
 2003: 2nd in Ironman Hawaii
 2003: 2nd in ITU World Championships - Ibiza
 2003: 2nd in Ironman Hawaii
 2004: 1st in Belgian Olympic distance triathlon
 2004: 5th in Ironman Hawaii
 2005: 1st in Ironman 70.3 Monaco
 2005: 4th in Ironman Hawaii
 2006: 4th in Ironman Hawaii
 2007: 1st in Ironman Arizona
 2007: 898th in Ironman Hawaii
 2008: 3rd in Ironman Hawaii
 2009: 1st in Ironman Cozumel

References

External links
 Uplace Pro Triathlon Team web site
 Rutger Beke's personal web site 

Belgian male triathletes
1977 births
Living people
People from Halle, Belgium
Sportspeople from Flemish Brabant